Akodon affinis, also known as the Colombian grass mouse or Cordillera Occidental akodont, is a species of rodent in the family Cricetidae.
It is found only in the Cordillera Occidental of Colombia.

References

Literature cited

Anderson, R.P. and Gómez-Laverde, M. 2008. . In IUCN. IUCN Red List of Threatened Species. Version 2009.2. <www.iucnredlist.org>. Downloaded on April 2, 2010.
Musser, G.G. and Carleton, M.D. 2005. Superfamily Muroidea. Pp. 894–1531 in Wilson, D.E. and Reeder, D.M. (eds.). Mammal Species of the World: a taxonomic and geographic reference. 3rd ed. Baltimore: The Johns Hopkins University Press, 2 vols., 2142 pp. 

Akodon
Endemic fauna of Colombia
Mammals of Colombia
Mammals of the Andes
Mammals described in 1912
Taxonomy articles created by Polbot